Harun Mehmedinović is a Bosnian American director, screenwriter, photographer, cinematographer, and author. He is a graduate of UCLA School of Theater, Film and Television and American Film Institute. He is the co-creator of the viral timelapse series SKYGLOW, cinematographer and co-producer of the Leonardo DiCaprio-produced documentary Ice on Fire for HBO, which premiered at Cannes Film Festival May 22, 2019. and cinematographer of IMAX Grand Canyon: Rivers of Time (2022). His film In the Name of the Son,  premiered at the Telluride Film Festival and went on to win over thirty international awards including Shanghai Film Festival.

Career 
Mehmedinović is a graduate of UCLA School of Theater, Film and Television and American Film Institute. He wrote and directed In the Name of the Son, which premiered at the Telluride Film Festival and went on to win over thirty international awards.

He is also an award winning photographer and contributor to BBC Earth, National Geographic, Vogue Italia, and has spoken at TED about his photography work. His photograph of the cloud-inverted Grand Canyon was listed among the 2015 Best Travel Photos of the Year by National Geographic. In 2016, Mehmedinović was on the BBC Earth Instagram team that won Webby Award for "Best Photography and Graphics." His work has been featured by various media outlets, including The New York Times, Wired, Time, Sierra Club Magazine, Forbes, NPR, Los Angeles Times, LA Weekly, Vice, and Washington Post, among others.

Mehmedinović has also contributed time-lapse videos for use in concerts and events, most notably by The Rolling Stones for their song Moonlight Mile during their Zip Code Tour in 2015 as well as for their songs Wild Horses and Angie for their Desert Trip appearance, Roger Waters for his song Breathe during the 2016 Desert Trip festival, Cosmic Gate for their music video for the single am2pm in 2016, Paul Simon’s 2018 Homeward Bound Farewell Tour, and John Mayer's 2022 SOB ROCK Tour.  

Mehmedinović is an author of three photography books: Seance, in 2013, with a foreword by Aleksandar Hemon, Persona in 2015, and SKYGLOW in 2017. Mehmedinovic collaborated with Gavin Heffernan on SKYGLOW, which was a crowdfunded book and Blu-Ray intended to tackle the rising danger and damage of urban light pollution. The fundraising campaign generated a tremendous amount of publicity and ended on May 9, 2015 as the fourth most successful Kickstarter campaign in the Photobooks category. SKYGLOW was featured by Science Channel's Outrageous Acts of Science, National Park Service as part of their official 2016 Centennial celebration video, and was released as a hardcover book and Blu-Ray series in April 2017.

In 2019, Mehmedinović competed work as a cinematographer on the Leonardo DiCaprio-produced Ice on Fire for HBO, which premiered to a standing ovation at Cannes Film Festival as part of the Official Selection.

Mehmedinović currently works at Southern Utah University as an assistant professor and film/area coordinator in the school's recently-opened film program.

Credits

Feature documentary films 
SKYGLOW (2024) – Director/Editor/Co-Cinematographer
 IMAX GRAND CANYON: RIVERS OF TIME (2022) – Co-Cinematographer
ICE ON FIRE (2019) – Cinematographer/Co-Producer
 AKICITA (2018) – Co-Cinematographer

Skyglow 
 WET MOUNTAIN VALLEY (2021) – Co-Director/Cinematographer/Editor
 ANCESTRAL NIGHTS (2019) – Co-Director/Cinematographer/Editor
 HAARP BOREALIS (2019) – Director/Cinematographer/Editor
 SKYGLOW NYC (2018) – Co-Director/Cinematographer/Editor
 Colorado Serenade (2018) – Director/Cinematographer/Editor
 Kaibab Requiem (2017) – Director/Cinematographer/Editor
 Mojave Forsaken (2017) – Co-Director/Cinematographer/Editor
 Stormhenge (2017) – Co-Director/Cinematographer
 POLI’AHU (2017) – Co-Director/Cinematographer
 Ft. Union Lullaby (2016) – Director/Cinematographer/Editor
 Hades Exhales (2016) – Director/Cinematographer/Editor
 Tortugas Rock (2016) – Director/Cinematographer/Editor 
Dishdance (2015) – Co-Director/Cinematographer/Editor 
Promo (2015) – Co-Director/Cinematographer 
YIKÁÍSDÁHÁ: "That Which Comes Before the Dawn" (2014) – Co-Director/Cinematographer

BBC Earth 
 Kaibab Elegy (2017) – Director/Cinematographer/Editor 
 Sandstorm Alomogordo (2016) – Director/Cinematographer/Editor 
 Amargosa Superbloom (2016) – Director/Cinematographer/Editor 
 Mojave Blues (2016) – Director/Cinematographer/Editor 
 Elkmont Symphony (2016) – Director/Cinematographer/Editor 
 Shenandoah Reverie (2015) – Director/Cinematographer/Editor 
 Melancholy Gorge (2015) – Director/Cinematographer/Editor 
 Pinnacles (2015) – Co-Director/Cinematographer 
 Tempest Vermilion (2015) – Co-Director/Cinematographer 
 Wavelight (2014) – Co-Director/Cinematographer

Concerts and Music Videos 
 Cielo Hemon: Howdy, Hand of God! (2021) – Director/Cinematographer/Editor  
 Paul Simon: Homeward Bound Tour (2018) – Co-Director/Cinematographer 
 Cosmic Gate: AM2PM (2016) – Co-Director/Cinematographer  
 Roger Waters: "Breathe" visuals for Desert Trip Indio and the 2016 Tour (2016) – Co-Director/Cinematographer 
 The Rolling Stones: "Angie" visuals for Desert Trip Megaconcert – Co-Director/Cinematographer 
 The Rolling Stones: "Wild Horses" visuals for Desert Trip Megaconcert – Co-Director/Cinematographer 
The Rolling Stones: "Moonlight Mile" visuals for ZIP CODE Tour (2015) – Co-Director/Cinematographer

Short Fiction Films 
 In the Name of the Son (2007) – Writer/Director

References

Year of birth missing (living people)
Living people
Film people from Sarajevo
Bosniaks of Bosnia and Herzegovina
American people of Bosniak descent
American film directors
American male screenwriters
American photographers
UCLA Film School alumni
Northern Arizona University faculty
Screenwriters from Arizona